Nebria turcica is a species of ground beetle in the Nebriinae subfamily that is endemic to Turkey.

Subspecies
The species have 3 subspecies all of which are endemic to Turkey:
Nebria turcica lassalei Leoux et Roux, 1990
Nebria turcica turcica Chaudoir, 1843
Nebria turcica wiedemanni Fischer von Waldheim, 1844

References

turcica
Beetles described in 1843
Beetles of Asia
Endemic fauna of Turkey